Juan Ignacio Chela was the defending champion but lost in the second round to Rubén Ramírez Hidalgo.

Nicolás Massú won in the final 6–4, 7–6(7–3), 6–2 against Raemon Sluiter.

Seeds

Draw

Finals

Section 1

Section 2

References
 2003 Priority Telecom Open Draw

Dutch Open (tennis)
2003 ATP Tour
2003 Dutch Open (tennis)